Dieter Kochan (born May 11, 1974), is a Canadian-born American former professional ice hockey goaltender who played for the United States men's national ice hockey team at the 2002 IIHF World Championship as well as 21 games for the NHL Tampa Bay Lightning and Minnesota Wild  between 2000 and 2003. He was the first player to be called up directly from the UHL to the NHL. He notably scored a goal for the B.C. Icemen, on January 5, 1999. He was a member of the Calder Cup champion Houston Aeros in 2002–03. Internationally Kochan played for the American national team at the 2002 World Championship.

Kochan was born in Saskatoon, Saskatchewan and raised in Madison, Wisconsin.

Roller Hockey
Kochan grew up in Wisconsin where he also played roller hockey. He was the principal goaltender of the gold medal U.S. roller hockey teams at the 1996, 1997 and 1998 World Championships. He was also goalie of the gold medal team at the 1999 Pan American Games.

Post career
Kochan announced his retirement on May 17, 2007, after playing the 2006–07 season with the Houston Aeros.  On October 3, 2013, it was announced that he will join the Michigan Tech Men's Hockey program as a volunteer assistant goaltending coach.

Career statistics

Regular season and playoffs

International

Awards and accomplishments
United Hockey League Second All-Star Team (2000) 
Harry "Hap" Holmes Memorial Award  (fewest goals against - AHL) (2004) (shared with Wade Dubielewicz) 
Member of Team USA at the 1996, 1997 and 1998 roller hockey World Championships & 1999 Pan American Games

References

External links

Canadian emigrants to the United States
1974 births
Living people
B.C. Icemen players
Bridgeport Sound Tigers players
Canadian ice hockey goaltenders
American men's ice hockey goaltenders
Detroit Vipers players
Grand Rapids Griffins (IHL) players
HC Sibir Novosibirsk players
Houston Aeros (1994–2013) players
Ice hockey people from Saskatchewan
Ice hockey players from Wisconsin
Sportspeople from Saskatoon
Sportspeople from Madison, Wisconsin
Louisville RiverFrogs players
Minnesota Wild players
Northern Michigan Wildcats men's ice hockey players
Orlando Solar Bears (IHL) players
Portland Pirates players
Sioux City Musketeers players
Springfield Falcons players
Tampa Bay Lightning players
Vancouver Canucks draft picks